Doyle McManus (born May 5, 1953) is an American journalist, columnist (for the Los Angeles Times), who appears often on Public Broadcasting Service's Washington Week.

Early life
Doyle Daniel McManus is the first-born son of Lois Doyle and the late James R. McManus, a San Francisco advertising executive. His younger brothers include Chris (born 1955) and Reed (born 1956).

He earned an A.B. in history at Stanford University in 1974, and was a Fulbright scholar at the University of Brussels.

Career
As an undergraduate, McManus worked on the Stanford Daily.

He was a foreign correspondent for three years at the United Press International, beginning in Brussels.

He joined the Los Angeles Times in 1978, reporting from Los Angeles, the Middle East, Central America, New York.  He transferred to the Times'''s Washington, D.C., bureau in 1983, where he covered the U.S. State Department, and White House.  He succeeded Jack Nelson as bureau chief in 1996.  After thirteen years as bureau chief, he reportedly told colleagues that he had "long ago asked for a new assignment."  In November 2008, the financially troubled Tribune Company made him a columnist when it closed the Los Angeles Times bureau in favor of a single Washington bureau for all its newspapers.

Mr. McManus has written for Foreign Policy, Time, Sports Illustrated, and the London Daily Express. He appears regularly on the PBS commentary program Washington Week.

He has covered every presidential election since 1984.

In January 2008, he was a moderator at Hillary Clinton and Barack Obama's presidential primary debate in Los Angeles.

Memberships and awards
Committee to Protect Journalists
Council on Foreign Relations
Hoover Institution William and Barbara Edwards Media Fellow April 19–24, 2004
Reporters Committee for Freedom of the Press Steering Committee
Phi Beta Kappa Society
Advisory Board of the Freeman Spogli Institute for International Studies at Stanford
Board of Visitors of the Philip Merrill College of Journalism at the University of Maryland, College Park
Stanford's board of trustees, from 1988 to 1993
National Press Club's Edwin Hood Award (four times) (2004 for articles on the U.S. occupation of Iraq)
Georgetown University's Weintal Prize

Bibliography

Personal
McManus and his wife reside in Bethesda, Maryland.

Notes

External links
Doyle McManus Personal website
Doyle McManus biography  Los Angeles Times'' official biography

Stanford University alumni
Vrije Universiteit Brussel alumni
American male journalists
American political writers
Los Angeles Times people
1955 births
Living people
Hoover Institution Edwards Media Fellows
Place of birth missing (living people)
American television journalists